Moussa Ag Acharatoumane is an Azawadi politician, who serves as a spokesperson for the National Movement for the Liberation of Azawad (MNLA) and was based in Paris, France as recently as 22 March 2012. He is founding leader of the MNLA.

References

Berber Malians
Tuareg people
Living people
Members of the National Movement for the Liberation of Azawad
Year of birth missing (living people)